The Candelaria River is a river of Central America that flows from Guatemala to Laguna de Términos, Mexico, It has a length of about  and drains a basin of .

See also
List of rivers of Mexico

References
Atlas of Mexico, 1975 (http://www.lib.utexas.edu/maps/atlas_mexico/river_basins.jpg).
The Prentice Hall American World Atlas, 1984.
Rand McNally, The New International Atlas, 1993.

Rivers of Guatemala
Rivers of Mexico
International rivers of North America
Drainage basins of the Gulf of Mexico
Geography of Campeche